Jacques Cattin (born 4 June 1958 in Colmar) was a member of the National Assembly of France. He represented Haut-Rhin's 2nd constituency, and is a member of The Republicans.

References

1958 births
Living people
People from Colmar
The Republicans (France) politicians
Deputies of the 15th National Assembly of the French Fifth Republic